In algebraic geometry, the conic sections in the projective plane form a linear system of dimension five, as one sees by counting the constants in the degree two equations. The condition to pass through a given point P imposes a single linear condition, so that conics C through P form a linear system of dimension 4. Other types of condition that are of interest include tangency to a given line L.

In the most elementary treatments a linear system appears in the form of equations

with λ and μ unknown scalars, not both zero. Here C and C′ are given conics. Abstractly we can say that this is a projective line in the space of all conics, on which we take

as homogeneous coordinates. Geometrically we notice that any point Q common to C and C′ is also on each of the conics of the linear system.  According to Bézout's theorem C and C′ will intersect in four points (if counted correctly). Assuming these are in general position, i.e. four distinct intersections, we get another interpretation of the linear system as the conics passing through the four given points (note that the codimension four here matches the dimension, one, in the five-dimensional space of conics). Note that of these conics, exactly three are degenerate, each consisting of a pair of lines, corresponding to the  ways of choosing 2 pairs of points from 4 points (counting via the multinomial coefficient, and accounting for the overcount by a factor of 2 that  makes when interested in counting pairs of pairs rather than just selections of size 2).

Applications 

Example 

  hyperbolae opening left and right;
  the parallel vertical lines 
(intersection point at [1:0:0])
   ellipses with a vertical major axis;
  a circle (with radius );
  ellipses with a horizontal major axis;
  the parallel horizontal lines 
(intersection point at [0:1:0])
  hyperbolae opening up and down,
  the diagonal lines 
(intersection point at [0:0:1])
 This then loops around to  since pencils are a projective line.

Classification 

References 
 
 
 

Conic sections